This list of Georgia Institute of Technology faculty current and former faculty, staff and presidents of the Georgia Institute of Technology.

Administration

Institute presidents

Other administration

Natural sciences

Engineering

Computer science

Mathematics

Social Sciences

Psychology

Public policy

Humanities

Literature

Athletics

References

Georgia Institute of Technology faculty